A Ilha dos Escravos (The Island of Slaves or The Isle of Slaves) is a 2008 Cape Verdean, Brazilian, Portuguese and Spanish drama film directed by Portuguese director Francisco Manso. It was based on a novel named "O Escravo" ("The Slave") written in 1856 by José Evaristo de Almeida, a Portuguese who was exiled in Cape Verde.

Plot
The film takes place during the 19th century during a revolt by Miguelists who were exiled in Cape Verde, and centres on a love triangle between Maria (Vanessa Giácomo), João (Ângelo Torres) and Albano Lopes (Diogo Infante). Maria is the daughter of a farmer,  João is a slave and Albano Lopes is a Miguelist official. A troop survey of the city of Praia, instigated by officers banished in the archipelago, as a result of a defeat of the partisans by Infante D. Miguel during the Portuguese Civil War, and a historic part of the film. The rebels, contrary to their own anti-liberal convictions, try to enlist the slaved population into their field, in the absence of other human means that embodies the designs.

Cast

See also
Cinema of Cape Verde
List of Brazilian films of 2008
List of Portuguese films of the 2000s
List of Spanish films of the 2000s

References

External links
 

2008 films
Cape Verdean drama films
Brazilian drama films
Portuguese drama films
Spanish drama films
Films set in Cape Verde
Culture of Santiago, Cape Verde
2008 drama films
Films directed by Francisco Manso